Cupidesthes minor is a butterfly in the family Lycaenidae. It is found in Ituri Province in the Democratic Republic of the Congo.

References

Butterflies described in 1921
Lycaenesthini